Established in 2008 by Nathan Taback, Christina Wille and Robin Coupland, Insecurity Insight is a Geneva-based non-profit organisation that has developed the ”Taback-Coupland model of armed violence”, a model that is used to generate data on the impact of armed violence and insecurity on people's lives and wellbeing with a view to generating preventive policies.

History
While working in conflict zones as a general surgeon treating war wounds (1987-1995), Coupland developed a theory about armed violence and its effects. The theory states that the effects of use of weapons on health have certain identifiable determinants:
 the victim's vulnerability;
 the type of weapon or weapons used;
 the potential number of weapons in use;
 the psychological aspect of how the violence is perpetrated.

While teaching a course at the Harvard School of Public Health (2003), Coupland began collaborating with Taback, a statistician with an interest in global health. Their collaboration involved refining Coupland's original theory and developing the means to make quantifiable the various determinants for a given outcome of armed violence. The result has come to be known as the Taback-Coupland model of armed violence.

Coupland and Taback later met Wille while she was working for the Small Arms Survey (2006), and applied the model to map the nature and extent of armed violence on a geographical basis. Willie worked on refining the model further and the structure of the corresponding databases to allow application of the model to analyze different kinds of violent events. Later Taback, Willie and Coupland founded Insecurity Insight (2008).

Activities
The core activity of Insecurity Insight is to promote, use and make available to others the Taback-Coupland model. Because the model can be applied to any act of violence using any weapons resulting in any effect, the model has been applied to subjects such as explosive force in populated areas, attacks on journalists and sexual violence in the Democratic Republic of Congo and in Zimbabwe and attacks on health care workers and facilities.

A major ongoing project is the building of the “Security in Numbers Database.” This is a collaborative effort initiated by Insecurity Insight involving a number of major international humanitarian NGOs. By taking part in this project, these organisations share their security incidents with Insecurity Insight on a confidential basis; this permits analysis of these incidents by the model and therefore comparison of any single agency’s security issues with what is known globally about aid worker security. This has already generated findings.

Taback-Coupland model of armed violence

Based on a standard public health model, the Taback-Coupland model takes as a starting point that use of weapons has a health impact and that this health impact is amenable to a preventive approach as any other public health issue. By generating data about threats to and vulnerabilities of people’s lives and well-being through violence and weapons, appropriate preventive policies can be proposed.

The model is constructed around four “risk factors” or determinants for any given effects of armed violence. The four determinants are the nature of the weapon, the number of weapons used (or potentially used), the way the weapon is used (the psychological aspect of the violence), and the victims’ vulnerability. An example is the lethality of attacks with firearms. This will be determined by:
 the kind of firearms (death is more likely if a larger calibre weapon is used, because the wound will be bigger);
 how many firearms are being shot against the victim(s);
 whether the user is standing close to (e.g. 5 metres) or further away (e.g. 200 metres) from the victim(s);
 whether the victim(s) of the attack are cornered, tied up, can run away or take cover.

This example also shows the important interaction at a psychological level between how the weapon is used, the other determinants and perceptions of the potential outcome. (Whether the trigger is pulled to cause a fatal injury is influenced, for example, by whether the user of the firearm believes he or she can hit the victim(s) with it, whether there are others similarly armed, how easy it is to hit the victim(s) in that context, and whether the victim(s) have already been hit.)

How to use the model
The method uses written reports of real incidents of armed violence as the source for the necessary values. Information from a report on an individual incident is entered into a spreadsheet specially designed to capture and process information about the people committing violence and about the victim(s) or potential victim(s). In this way, qualitative sources of data about violence i.e., reports, can be fed into a specially prepared relational database; this uses binaries and surrogates to give a numeric value to determinants such as intent and vulnerability. (For example, for vulnerability: Were the people herded into a confined space before being shot? Yes / No) A “report” can be a very short text as indicated by the following sentence: “Two masked men entered Hospital X last night and shot dead a sleeping patient.” In terms of entry into the database, this can be read as: Two masked men [number of people armed] entered Hospital X [where] last night [when] and shot [weapon (firearms)] dead [outcome] a [outcome] sleeping patient [vulnerability]. ("Shot dead" is also a comment on intent.)

When the database has been fed with a sufficient number of reports of real events about a certain issue, this permits an “evidence-based” dialogue about the perpetrators and their intents and about the victims and their vulnerabilities. Taback and Coupland tested the model using global news reports about violence in general and about attacks on journalists. They went further and termed such an approach “the science of human security.”

All important limitations of the data gathering method based on the model relate to the completeness and accuracy of the qualitative reports which are fed into the model. However, as Taback and Coupland have pointed out, reports, especially media reports may be the only information available about a given context or form of violence in multiple contexts. It is nevertheless possible to generate policy-relevant quantitative data from such sources. Further, they point out that while there are international surveillance systems for monitoring infectious disease outbreaks, no such system exists (yet) to evaluate on a regular basis the effects of armed violence on peoples’ lives. With that in mind, the method developed by Taback and Coupland is a useful contribution to international efforts to enhance human security, including in disarmament.

Use of the Taback-Coupland model
The model has generated original and policy-relevant data in relation to subjects such as explosive force in populated areas, and sexual violence in the Democratic Republic of Congo and in Zimbabwe. A major study involving analysis of 655 attacks on health care workers and facilities was commissioned by the International Committee of the Red Cross (ICRC); its publication marked the launch of the ICRC’s “Health Care in Danger” project. Another major ongoing project is the “Security in Numbers Database.”

See also
 Armed violence reduction
 Cost of conflict
 Geneva Declaration on Armed Violence and Development
 International Committee of the Red Cross
 Small Arms Survey
 United Nations Institute for Disarmament Research
 World Health Organization

References

External links
 Bibliography on weapons and health
 Insecurity Insight's website
 Safeguarding Health in Conflict 

International medical and health organizations
International scientific organizations
Organisations based in Switzerland
Organizations established in 2008
Public health research